Alan J. Auerbach (born in 1951) is an American economist. He is currently the director of the Robert D. Burch Center for Tax Policy and Public Finance at the University of California, Berkeley. He received his undergraduate degree in economics and mathematics from Yale University and earned his Ph.D. in economics at Harvard University and was an assistant and then an associate professor at Harvard. He was then a professor of law and economics at the University of Pennsylvania.

Auerbach is a fellow of the American Academy of Arts and Sciences and of the Econometric Society. He was the Deputy Chief of Staff of the U.S. Joint Committee on Taxation in 1992.

He is the author of many articles, books, and reviews. He is the past, or present, editor of six journals including the Journal of Economic Literature, American Economic Review, National Tax Journal, and International Tax and Public Finance.

Selected books 

 (1987) "Handbook of Public Economics". Elsevier Science Limited. .
 (1998) Auerbach, and Kotlikoff, "Macroeconomics: An Integrated Approach". MIT Press. .
 (2007) "Taxing Corporate Income in the 21st Century". Cambridge University Press. .

References

External links

Living people
21st-century American economists
Harvard Graduate School of Arts and Sciences alumni
University of California, Berkeley College of Letters and Science faculty
Harvard University faculty
University of Pennsylvania faculty
Fellows of the Econometric Society
Fellows of the American Academy of Arts and Sciences
1951 births
Auerbach family
UC Berkeley School of Law faculty